De Skâns-Oostmahorn is a village in the Dutch province of Friesland. It is located in the municipality Noardeast-Fryslân and had, as of January 2017, a population of 65. Before 2019, the village was part of the Dongeradeel municipality.

Before 2006 the village was part of Eanjum. De Skâns-Oostmahorn is located on the west-side of the Lauwersmeer. The ferry to Schiermonnikoog that had previously left from De Skâns-Oostmahorn now leaves from Lauwersoog. Esonstad is a nearby holiday village.

History 
The village was first mentioned in 1543 as Oes(t)mehorne, and means eastern settlement.

De Skâns-Oostmahorn was conquered by the geus (freedom fighter during the Dutch Revolt) Bartholt Entens van Mentheda who constructed a sconce near the village. The sconce was unsuccessfully attacked in 1576 by the Spanish colonel Caspar Robles. . A coastal battery was built in its place in the late 18th century, and remained in service until 1849.

In 1840, De Skâns-Oostmahorn was home to 66 people.

Gallery

References

External links

Noardeast-Fryslân
Populated places in Friesland
Populated coastal places in the Netherlands